The Brazilian blind electric ray (Benthobatis kreffti), is a species of fish in the family Narcinidae endemic to Brazil. Its natural habitat is open seas.

References

Narcinidae
Fish described in 2001
Fish of Brazil
Endemic fauna of Brazil
Taxonomy articles created by Polbot